Havlíčkův Brod is a railway station in Havlíčkův Brod in Vysočina Region of the Czech Republic.

History
The first train left the station in the direction of Jihlava on December 21, 1870. In 1898 a track was connected to Žďár nad Sázavou. A new railway station building was completed in 1970. In front of the building is the town bus station.

References

External links

 České dráhy a.s.

Railway stations in Vysočina Region
Railway stations opened in 1870
Carl Schlimp railway stations
19th-century establishments in Bohemia
Buildings and structures in Havlíčkův Brod
Railway stations in the Czech Republic opened in the 19th century